Paula Shane Pryke  (born 29 April 1960) is a British florist and author.

Family and education

Pryke was educated at Culford School (1970–1978), followed by Trinity and All Saints College (then affiliated with the University of Leeds), where she studied history Pryke also earned a licentiate from the Royal Academy of Music in 1985.

Career
After starting a career as a history teacher, Pryke first became a florist in 1987.  The following year, she founded Paula Pryke Flowers in London. In 2000, Pryke received the Ambassador for Floral Industry Award, NFU.

Pryke was appointed Officer of the Order of the British Empire (OBE) in the 2014 Birthday Honours for services to the floral design industry.[1]

She lectures on and exhibits floral art worldwide.

Works

References 

 Who's Who (2007 Edition):

External links
 Paula Pryke

1960 births
Alumni of Leeds Trinity University
Alumni of the Royal Academy of Music
Living people
British botanists
People educated at Culford School
Florists
Officers of the Order of the British Empire
British women writers